Greg Hawick  (3 May 1932 – 6 February 2020) was an Australian rugby league footballer and coach.

Playing career

Club
A South Sydney junior Hawick had played with the Alexandria Rovers junior club. Hawick made his first-grade debut with Souths in 1950 as a lock forward but subsequently switched to the backline playing halfback and centre. He won a premiership with Souths in his debut year, but then missed out on a second in season 1951 when his jaw was broken in the semi-final against St George. He eventually gained his second premiership victory in the 1954 NSWRFL season. Hawick's career with South Sydney stretched from 1950 to 1956, during which he played in five premiership winning teams. In all he played 84 first grade games scoring 19 tries and kicking 62 goals for a total of 181 career points.

Hawick played his club football with Wagga in country New South Wales for the 1957 & 58 season. He fought a landmark battle against the NSWRFL in 1958 when after having signed a contract with North Sydney he reneged, chose to stay in Wagga and was disqualified by the League. An equity court ruled that the disqualification was a denial of natural justice and he was able to play the season in Wagga and was still selected in the state and the national team that year.

Hawick was lured to North Sydney for the 1959 & 1960 seasons. He returned to country rugby league with Wagga from 1961 and his playing career ended there in 1963 a result of another broken jaw.

Representative
Hawick made six Test appearances for the Australian national side. He also played eight games for New South Wales including appearances in 1957 & 58 when his club football was played in the country..

Hawick toured with the Kangaroos to Great Britain in 1952–53, playing two tests, another 16 tour matches and scoring eight tries. He also toured to New Zealand with the Kangaroos in 1953 playing two tests, six other tour matches and scoring two tries and kicking three goals. Hawick played in the first World Cup in 1954 and was part of the 1957 World Cup-winning team.

Accolades
In 2004 he was named by Souths in their South Sydney Dream Team, which consisted of seventeen players and a coach representing the club from 1908 through to 2004.

In 2007 Hawick was selected by a panel of experts at five-eighth in an Australian 'Team of the 50s'.

Coaching career
Hawick coached Norths from 1983 until his sacking midway through the 1985 NSWRL season.

Sources
  Andrews, Malcolm, The ABC of Rugby League, Austn Broadcasting Corpn, Sydney.
 Whiticker, Alan & Hudson, Glen (2006) The Encyclopedia of Rugby League Players, Gavin Allen Publishing, Sydney
Team of the 50s named – Daily Telegraph article at news.com.au
Greg Hawick at yesterdayshero.com.au

Footnotes

1932 births
2020 deaths
Australia national rugby league team players
Australian rugby league coaches
Australian rugby league players
North Sydney Bears coaches
North Sydney Bears players
Rugby league five-eighths
Rugby league players from Sydney
South Sydney Rabbitohs players